Lubor Tokoš (7 February 1923 in Šternberk – 29 September 2003 in Zlín) was a Czech actor. He starred in the 1969/1970 film Witchhammer under director Otakar Vávra.

Selected filmography
The Fabulous World of Jules Verne (1958)
Witchhammer (1970)
Forbidden Dreams (1986)
Princess Jasnenka and the Flying Shoemaker (1987)

External links

References

1923 births
2003 deaths
People from Šternberk
Czech male film actors
Czech male stage actors
Czech male voice actors
20th-century Czech male actors
Recipients of the Thalia Award